Ramlal Joshi is a Nepalese writer and educator from Dhangadi. In 2016, he won the Madan Puraskar for his short–story collection, Aina.

Joshi is a resident of Dhangadhi city in Kailali district of Sudurpashchim province. Previously, he had been a political activist, a journalist and a teacher. He had been the chairman of Sudur Paschimanchal Sahitya Samaj, an organization for the promotion of literature and culture in far west region of Nepal.

He began his literary career by publishing a Gazal collection titled Hatkela ma Aakash in 2000 (2057 BS). He received Madan Purskar for his book Aina (i.e., Mirror), an anthology of short stories in Nepali.

He published his second book Sakhi, a novel on 6 October 2018. On 2 September 2022, he published his third book, a second short–story collection titled Ba Aama.

Bibliography

References

Madan Puraskar winners
Nepali-language writers
21st-century Nepalese male writers
People from Kailali District
Year of birth missing